The 2009 ICC Women's World Twenty20 was the inaugural ICC Women's World Twenty20 competition, taking place in England from 11 to 21 June 2009. All group stage matches were played at the County Ground in Taunton, with the semi-finals held at Trent Bridge and The Oval, and the final at Lord's. The tournament featured eight teams split into two groups.

England and New Zealand contested the final, with the host nation bowling out New Zealand for 85, helped by Player of the Match Katherine Brunt's opening spell of 3 for 6. Player of the Tournament Claire Taylor's 39* saw England home to a comfortable six wicket victory.

Squads

Warm-up Games

Pool stage

Group A

Points Table

Fixtures

Group B

Points Table

Fixtures

Knockout stage

Semi-finals

Final

Statistics

Most runs

Most wickets

ICC Team of the Tournament

After the tournament's conclusion an ICC panel of experts picked the best composite XI from the players in the Women's World Twenty20.

1 Shelley Nitschke (Australia)

2 Charlotte Edwards (England)

3 Claire Taylor (England)

4 Aimee Watkins (New Zealand)

5 Sarah Taylor (England)

6 Suzie Bates (New Zealand)

7 Lucy Doolan (New Zealand)

8 Rumeli Dhar (India)

9 Holly Colvin (England)

10 Sian Ruck (New Zealand)

11 Laura Marsh (England)

12th man: Eshani Kaushalya (Sri Lanka)

References

 
International cricket competitions in 2009
2009 in English women's cricket
June 2009 sports events in the United Kingdom
2009 in women's cricket
International women's cricket competitions in England